Mount Allen is a peak, 1,400 m, standing between Clark Glacier and the head of Greenwood Valley in Victoria Land. Charted by the Victoria University of Wellington Antarctic Expedition (VUWAE), 1959–60, and named for A.D. Allen, one of the party's geologists.

References

Further reading
 B.R. WILLIAMSON, K.J. KREUTZ, P.A. MAYEWSKI, N.A.N. BERTLER, S. SNEED, M. HANDLEY, D. INTRONE, A coastal transect of McMurdo Dry Valleys (Antarctica) snow and firn: marine and terrestrial influences on glaciochemistry, Journal of Glaciology, Vol. 53, No. 183, 2007, P 686

Allen, Mount